This is a list of broadcast television stations that are licensed in the U.S. state of Delaware.

Note: Delaware is served by four TV markets: Philadelphia (DMA #4), Salisbury/Dover (DMA #144), Baltimore (DMA #28), and Washington DC (DMA #9).  See Template:Philly TV, Template:Salisbury TV, and Template:Baltimore TV, and Template:Washington TV for details.

Full-power stations licensed to cities in Delaware
VC refers to the station's PSIP virtual channel. RF refers to the station's physical RF channel.

Defunct full-power stations
Channel 12: WVUE - NBC/Ind. - Wilmington (6/30/1949-9/13/1958)

LPTV stations

See also
 Delaware media
 List of newspapers in Delaware
 List of radio stations in Delaware
 Media of locales in Delaware: Dover, Wilmington

External links
  (Directory ceased in 2017)
 Maryland, DC, Delaware Broadcasters Association

Delaware

Television stations